Monica Ward (born August 5, 1965) is an Italian actress and voice actress.

Biography
Ward contributes to dubbing characters in anime, cartoons, movies, and other content as well as voicing characters in Italian animation such as Nova in Winx Club. She is best known as the voice of Lisa Simpson in the Italian dub of the animated series The Simpsons. She also voiced Marina in the second Italian dub of Hans Christian Andersen's The Little Mermaid, Steff in the Italian dub of Freakazoid! and Blossom in the Italian dubs of The Powerpuff Girls and Powerpuff Girls Z.

Ward has American ancestry on her father's side. Her paternal grandfather was a U.S Marine during World War I.

She is the youngest child and only daughter of Aleardo and Maresa Ward and the younger sister of Luca and Andrea Ward.

Voice work

Animation
 Blair in Soul Eater
 Steff in Freakazoid!
 Blossom in The Powerpuff Girls
 Blossom in Powerpuff Girls Z
 Blossom in The Powerpuff Girls Movie
 Lisa Simpson in The Simpsons
 Lisa Simpson in The Simpsons Movie
 Angelica Pickles in Rugrats (2nd dub)
 Marina in Hans Christian Andersen's The Little Mermaid (2nd dub)
 Nakoma in Disney's Pocahontas and its 1998 direct-to-video sequel
 Skunk in Skunk Fu!
 Nova in Winx Club
 Heather in Total Drama
 Elena Patata and Ezechiele Zick in Monster Allergy
 Caitlin Cooke in 6teen
 Nova in Super Robot Monkey Team Hyperforce Go!
 Cathy Kawaye in Sarah Lee Jones
 Maggie Lee in Maya & Miguel
 Nicky Little in Pepper Ann
 Juniper Lee in The Life and Times of Juniper Lee
 Jelly in TeachTown
 Haruna Sakurada in Sailor Moon (Viz Media redub)
 Leona Lion in Between the Lions
 Diana Lombard in Martin Mystery
 Ranma Saotome (female) in Ranma ½ (episodes 1-161) (1st dub)
 Kyoko Otonashi, Kentaro Ichinose and Ritsuko Chigusa in Maison Ikkoku (episodes 1-52)
 Filmore in South Park
 Marshall, Farmer Yumi, and various characters in PAW Patrol
 Lola Bunny in Baby Looney Tunes
 Lily in LeapFrog
 Marinette in Tomodachi Life: The TV Series
 Vince LaSalle in Recess
 Laura Carrot, Annie, Miss Achmetha and Grandma Gourd in VeggieTales
 Maria Hill in The Avengers: Earth's Mightiest Heroes
 Shock in The Nightmare Before Christmas
 Boots in Dora the Explorer
 Todd in ToddWorld
 Athena, Josephine X, Spring Horae, Hera in Class of the Titans
 Sagwa in Sagwa, the Chinese Siamese Cat
 Olly in (mini cuccioli)
 Mimi in Baby Felix
 Sophie McNally in ChalkZone

Live action shows
 Samantha Spade in Without a Trace (played by  Poppy Montgomery)
 Summer Van Horn in Make It or Break It (played by Candace Cameron Bure)

Cinema
 Cheerleader in Scream
 Sandra Babcox in ParaNorman

Dubbing director
 Total Drama
 Chuck (season 2-present)

See also
 Non-English versions of The Simpsons

References

External links
 
 
 

1965 births
Living people
Actresses from Rome
Italian voice actresses
Italian voice directors
Italian people of American descent
People of Tuscan descent